Alu in Iran may refer to:
 Alu, Ardabil
 Alu, Mazandaran

See also
 Allu, Iran (disambiguation)